Best of Luck is a Punjabi film starring Gippy Grewal, Jazzy B (in his acting debut), Binnu Dhillon, Simran Kaur Mundi (Miss India Universe 2008) and Sonam Bajwa.

Music for the film was composed by Jatinder Shah. Shooting of the film started in May 2012 in Vancouver, British Columbia, Canada, and the second schedule was completed in Jalandhar, Punjab in September 2012.

Plot
Kallu Gippy Grewal and Happy Binnu Dhillon accidentally kidnap Goli Jazzy B. Goli, a gangster then uses these two to help win over Preet's Grandfather so that he can marry Preet.

Cast
 Jazzy B as Goli
 Gippy Grewal as Kullu
 Simran Kaur Mundi as Preet
 Sonam Bajwa as Simran
 Binnu Dhillon as Happy
 Bobby Bedi as Shamsher singh
 Rishma Johal as Jot
 Puneet Issar as Jarnail Singh
 Karamjit Anmol as Servant Ballu
 Harpal singh as Harpal (Simran's father)
 Miss Pooja as Herself (Special Appearance)
 Parminder Bagga as Cop (Cameo)

Music

"Gal 91 Ya 92" - Gippy Grewal - Music: Jatinder Shah - Lyrics: Veet Baljit
"Goli Hik Vich" - Gippy Grewal, Jazzy B - Music: Jatinder Shah - Lyrics: Veet Baljit
"Happy Shappy" - Gippy Grewal, Jazzy B - Music: Jatinder Shah - Lyrics: Kumaar
"Jatt Kaym" - Jazzy B - Music: Jatinder Shah - Lyrics: Gurminder Mado-K
"Judaiyan" (Version 1) - Javed Ali - Music: Jatinder Shah
"Judaiyan" (Version 2) - Master Saleem - Music: Jatinder Shah
"Papa Nu Pata Lag Ju" - Gippy Grewal - Music: Jatinder Shah - Lyrics: Kumaar
"Rattan Lamiyan" (Version 1) - Kamal Khan - Music: Jatinder Shah - Lyrics: Javed Ali
"Rattan Lamiyan" (Version 2) - Javed Ali - Music: Jatinder Shah - Lyrics: Javed Ali

References

External links
 Best of Luck Movie on PunjabiCinema.org
 
 Best of Luck Movie on CinePunjab.com
 Best of Luck Review on Ballewood.in

2013 films
Punjabi-language Indian films
2010s Punjabi-language films
Films scored by Jatinder Shah